Drifika (also known as Drefekal) is a mountain peak in the Karakoram range, far west of the Transhimalaya.

Location 
It is considered part of the Masherbrum Mountains.

Both the north route, through the Kharidas valley, and the south route, through the Nangma valley, are viable routes to the summit. The south route is the most popular for climbing due to its easy accessibility from base camp.

Climbing history 
In 1978, a group of Japanese climbers led by Akiya Ishimura were the first group of mountaineers to reach the summit.

References 

Mountains of Pakistan
Mountains of Gilgit-Baltistan